Luke Frank Glavenich (January 17, 1893 – May 22, 1935) was a Major League Baseball pitcher who played for one season. He pitched for the Cleveland Naps for one game during the 1913 Cleveland Naps season. He attended Saint Mary's College of California.

External links

1893 births
1935 deaths
Major League Baseball pitchers
Cleveland Naps players
Baseball players from California
Omaha Rourkes players
New Orleans Pelicans (baseball) players
Saint Mary's Gaels baseball players
People from Jackson, California